Uffington is a village and civil parish in the South Kesteven district of Lincolnshire, England. The population of the civil parish at the 2011 census was 686.  It is in the valley of the River Welland, between Stamford and The Deepings.

Geography

Uffington Park, the grounds of a country house built in 1681 by the Bertie family and demolished by fire in 1904, lies between the village and the River Welland. Subsidiary buildings of Uffington House remain.

To the north-east is Casewick House, a Grade I listed building. It was a medieval house remodelled in the 17th century by the Trollope family and divided into three units and sold in the 1980s.

Towards Stamford lay Newstead Priory.  Newstead Mill is a Grade II listed watermill on the River Gwash; it is now converted to flats.

Community
The Grade I listed parish church, St Michael and All Angels, dates back to the 12th century and was majorly restored in 1864 by Edward Browning. It is part of the Uffington Group of churches that also includes Tallington, Barholm, West Deeping Wilsthorpe, Braceborough and Greatford. On the west side of the village is a nursery, and on the Market Deeping side, The Bertie Arms public house is on Bertie Lane.

The village holds an annual Scarecrow Adventure trail where visitors participate in early May Bank Holiday festivities and search for scarecrows around the village.

Until 1961 the village was served by Uffington and Barnack railway station. Today the village is served by Delaine Buses on the Stamford to Market Deeping route.

Lost village
Casewick House is the location of a Deserted Medieval Village mentioned as "Casuic" in the Domesday survey, and as "Casewick" in a tax list of 1334.  By 1816 only Casewick House and one other house had survived.

Governance

Uffington is served by a parish council, two district councillors who represent Casewick Ward on South Kesteven District Council and a county councillor representing Deepings West & Rural Division on Lincolnshire County Council. The district councillors re-elected in 2015 are Kelham Cooke (Con) and Rosemary Trollope-Bellew (Con). The county councillor elected in 2017 is Rosemary Trollope-Bellew (Con).

References

External links

 Parish Council website
 Uffington Group of Churches
 Uffington Primary school
 Village Information

Villages in Lincolnshire
Civil parishes in Lincolnshire
South Kesteven District